William Acton may refer to:

Politicians
William Acton (senior), English MP
William Acton (junior), English MP
William Acton (politician, died 1744), English MP
William Acton (politician, died 1567), English MP
William Acton (Wicklow MP) (1789–1854), MP for Wicklow 1841–48
William M. Acton (1876–1957), American lawyer and politician

Others
William Acton (doctor) (1813–1875), British doctor and writer
Sir William Acton, 1st Baronet (1570–1651), English merchant and Royalist
William Acton, warden of the Marshalsea prison, London, in the 1720s
William Acton (painter) (1906–1945), Anglo-Italian painter

See also